Metabotropic glutamate receptor 4 is a protein that in humans is encoded by the GRM4 gene.

Together with GRM6, GRM7 and GRM8 it belongs to group III of the metabotropic glutamate receptor family. Group III receptors are linked to the inhibition of the cyclic AMP cascade.
Activation of GRM4 has potential therapeutic benefits in the treatment of parkinson's disease. Splice variant "taste-GRM4" is involved in the perception of umami taste.

Ligands

Orthosteric
Cinnabarinic acid, a tryptophan metabolite
LSP1-2111: agonist
 LSP4-2022: agonist
 LSP2-9166: mixed agonist at mGluR4 and mGluR7

Positive allosteric modulators (PAMs)
 Foliglurax (PXT-002331, DT-1687)
 Tricyclic thiazolopyrazole derivative 22a: EC50 = 9 nM, Emax = 120%
 ML-128: EC50 = 240 nM, Emax = 182%
 VU0652957 (AP-472) (Valiglurax)
 VU-0418506
 VU-001171: EC50 = 650 nM, Emax = 141%, 36-fold shift
 VU-0155041: subtype-selective PAM, intrinsic allosteric agonist activity, robust in-vivo activity
 PHCCC: PAM of mGluR4, negative allosteric modulator of mGluR1, direct agonist at mGluR6

References

Further reading 

 
 
 
 
 
 
 
 
 
 
 
 
 
 
 
 

Metabotropic glutamate receptors